Vanity Fair is a monthly magazine of popular culture, fashion, and current affairs published by Condé Nast in the United States.

The first version of Vanity Fair was published from 1913 to 1936. The imprint was revived in 1983 and currently includes five international editions of the magazine. As of 2018, the Editor-in-Chief is Radhika Jones. Vanity Fair is most recognized for its celebrity pictures and the occasional controversy that surrounds its more risqué images. Furthermore, the publication is known for its energetic writing, in-depth reporting, and social commentary.

History

Dress and Vanity Fair

Condé Montrose Nast began his empire by purchasing the men's fashion magazine Dress in 1913. He renamed the magazine Dress and Vanity Fair and published four issues in 1913. It continued to thrive into the 1920s. However, it became a casualty of the Great Depression and declining advertising revenues, although its circulation, at 90,000 copies, was at its peak. Condé Nast announced in December 1935 that Vanity Fair would be folded into Vogue (circulation 156,000) as of the March 1936 issue. Vanity Fair celebrates its 95th anniversary in 2008, as well as its 25th anniversary as a relaunched publication. The National Portrait Gallery in London has mounted an exhibition called "Vanity Fair Portraits, 1913–2008," which will travel to the Scottish National Portrait Gallery in Edinburgh, the Los Angeles County Museum of Art, and the National Portrait Gallery in Canberra, Australia, to celebrate the magazine's photographic heritage. Vanity Fair: The Portraits, a special jubilee issue and hardback book, will be published in the fall of 2008.

Vanity Fair is notably a fictitious place ruled by Beelzebub in the book Pilgrim's Progress by John Bunyan. Later use of the name was influenced by the well-known 1847–48 novel of the same name by William Makepeace Thackeray.

Modern revival
Condé Nast Publications, under the ownership of S.I. Newhouse, announced in June 1981 that it was reviving the magazine. The first issue was released in February 1983 (cover date March), edited by Richard Locke, formerly of The New York Times Book Review. After three issues, Locke was replaced by Leo Lerman, veteran features editor of Vogue. He was followed by editors Tina Brown (1984–1992), Graydon Carter (1992-2017) and Radhika Jones (2017 to present). Regular writers and columnists have included Dominick Dunne, Sebastian Junger, Michael Wolff, Maureen Orth and Christopher Hitchens. Famous contributing photographers for the magazine include Bruce Weber, Annie Leibovitz, Mario Testino and Herb Ritts, who have all provided the magazine with a string of lavish covers and full-page portraits of current celebrities. Amongst the most famous of these was the August 1991 Leibovitz cover featuring a naked, pregnant Demi Moore, an image entitled More Demi Moore that to this day holds a spot in pop culture.

In addition to its controversial photography, the magazine also prints articles on a variety of topics. In 1996, journalist Marie Brenner wrote an exposé on the tobacco industry titled "The Man Who Knew Too Much". The article was later adapted into a movie The Insider (1999), which starred Al Pacino and Russell Crowe. Most famously, after more than thirty years of mystery, an article in the May 2005 edition revealed the identity of Deep Throat (W. Mark Felt), one of the sources for The Washington Post articles on Watergate, which led to the 1974 resignation of U.S. President Richard Nixon. The magazine also features candid interviews with celebrities, including a monthly Proust Questionnaire. Other notable interviews have included: Teri Hatcher, who revealed in the magazine that she was sexually abused as a child; Jennifer Aniston's first interview after her divorce from Brad Pitt; Anderson Cooper, who talked about his brother's death; and Martha Stewart's first interview after her release from prison.

Some of the pictorials in Vanity Fair have attracted criticism. The April 1999 issue featured an image of actor Mike Myers dressed as a Hindu deity for a photo spread by David LaChapelle: after criticism, both the photographer and the magazine apologized.

The magazine was the subject of Toby Young's book, How to Lose Friends and Alienate People, about his search for success in New York City while working for Graydon Carter's Vanity Fair. The book was made into a movie in 2008, with Jeff Bridges playing Carter.

In 2013, Condé Nast Entertainment struck a deal with Discovery Communications-owned cable channel Investigation Discovery for Vanity Fair Confidential, a crime and mystery documentary TV series based on stories from Vanity Fair magazine. Condé Nast Entertainment launched a Vanity Fair YouTube channel in July 2013. In anticipation of its 100th anniversary that year, Vanity Fair co-produced 10 short films, one to celebrate each decade, from well-known documentary filmmakers like Barbara Kopple and including the film producer Judd Apatow, and actors Don Cheadle and Bryce Dallas Howard.

Vanity Fair launched The Hive in June 2016, its online business, politics and technology news vertical. In January 2017, Vanity Fair'''s Hive and Condé Nast Entertainment partnered with Cheddar online TV channel to create a live weekly series called VF Hive on Cheddar. Editor Graydon Carter called the series a "representation of how people are consuming more voraciously than ever".

In 2017 former editor Tina Brown published "The Vanity Fair Diaries". It was announced in November 2017 that Radhika Jones, editorial director of The New York Times books section, would succeed Carter as Editor-in-Chief on December 11, 2017.

In 2018, Vanity Fair received accolades for removing actor James Franco from a cover shoot following sexual harassment allegations.

In 2020, Dario Calmese became the first Black photographer to shoot the cover of a Vanity Fair issue; his subject was Viola Davis. Vanity Fair employees unionized in 2022.

International editions
There are currently five international editions of Vanity Fair being published; namely in the United Kingdom (since 1991), Italy (since 2003, ISSN 1723-6673), Spain (since 2008), France (since 2013), and Mexico (since 2015), with the Italian version published weekly. The Italian Vanity Fair was established in October 2003 and celebrated its 10th anniversary in 2013.Vanity Fair Germany launched in February 2007 at a cost of €50 million, then the most expensive new magazine in Germany in years and Condé Nast's biggest investment outside the United States. After circulation had plummeted from half a million to less than 200,000 per week, the German edition was shut down in 2009.

Events
As a successor to a similar invitation-only event annually held by the late agent Irving Paul Lazar, the first Vanity Fair Oscar Party took place in 1994. During its first years, the magazine's Oscar party was co-hosted by producer Steve Tisch at Morton's in West Hollywood. At first, editor Graydon Carter kept the invitation list small, at around 120 for dinner. In 2008, in sympathy with a Writers Guild of America strike, Vanity Fair canceled its annual party. Between 2009 and 2013, the party was held at Sunset Tower. The 2014 edition took place in a temporary, 12,000-square-foot glass-walled structure at 8680 Sunset Boulevard. Vanity Fair makes a limited number of invitations available each year for charity.Vanity Fair llega a México  GQ. October 29, 2014. Retrieved April 15, 2015.

In recent years Vanity Fair and Bloomberg have hosted an after-party at the French ambassador's house following the White House Correspondents' Association dinner.

The most recent and notable event hosted by Vanity Fair is the 2022 Oscar party held at the Wallis Annenberg Center in Beverly Hills. The party gained rapid media attention when actor Will Smith slapped actor and host Chris Rock across the face for commenting on his wife Jada Pinkett Smith. Vanity Fair responded by banning Will Smith from attending any events for ten years.

Controversy
Roman Polanski lawsuit
In 2005, Vanity Fair was found liable in a lawsuit brought in the UK by film director Roman Polanski, who claimed the magazine had libelled him in an article by A. E. Hotchner published in 2002. The article recounted a claim by Lewis H. Lapham, editor of Harper's, that Polanski had made sexual advances towards a young model as he was traveling to the funeral of his wife, Sharon Tate, in August 1969, claiming that he could make her "the next Sharon Tate". The court permitted Polanski to testify via a video link, after he expressed fears that he might be extradited were he to enter the United Kingdom. 

The trial began on July 18, 2005, and Polanski made English legal history as the first claimant to give evidence by video link. During the trial, which included the testimonies of Mia Farrow and others, it was proved that the alleged scene at the famous New York restaurant Elaine's could not possibly have taken place on the date given, because Polanski only dined at this restaurant three weeks later. Also, the Norwegian then-model disputed the accounts that he had claimed to be able to make her "the next Sharon Tate".

Polanski was awarded damages by the High Court in London. The case was notable because Polanski was living in France as a fugitive from U.S. justice, and never appeared in the London court for fear he would be extradited to the U.S. Graydon Carter, editor of Vanity Fair, responded, "I find it amazing that a man who lives in France can sue a magazine that is published in America in a British courtroom."

Miley Cyrus photos
On April 25, 2008, the televised entertainment program Entertainment Tonight reported that 15-year-old Miley Cyrus had posed topless for a photo shoot with Vanity Fair. The photo, and subsequently released behind-the-scenes photos, show Cyrus without a top, her bare back exposed but her front covered with a bedsheet. The photo shoot was taken by photographer Annie Leibovitz. The full photograph was published with an accompanying story on The New York Times website on April 27, 2008. On April 29, 2008, The New York Times clarified that though the pictures left an impression that she was bare-breasted, Cyrus was wrapped in a bedsheet and was actually not topless. Some parents expressed outrage at the nature of the photograph, which a Disney spokesperson described as "a situation [that] was created to deliberately manipulate a 15-year-old to sell magazines". 

In response to the internet circulation of the photo and ensuing media attention, Miley Cyrus released a statement of apology on April 27: "I took part in a photo shoot that was supposed to be 'artistic' and now, seeing the photographs and reading the story, I feel so embarrassed. I never intended for any of this to happen and I apologize to my fans who I care so deeply about." Nearly ten years later to the day, Cyrus repudiated the Disney apology statement in an Instagram story showing a New York Post front page regarding the story, simply stating "IM NOT SORRY Fuck YOU #10YearsAgo".

Modified photos
In January 2014, Vanity Fair was under fire for allegedly altering the appearance of a celebrity featured in its pages for its February issue, Lupita Nyong'o, an actress known for her role in 12 Years A Slave. In Nyong'o's case, the magazine tweeted the photo and it began with fans accusing the company of altering her complexion. However, some believe that the Vanity Fair images are simply a product of bright set lighting, rather than deliberate skin lightening. Nyong'o was pleased with the work and saw no harm done to herself; she did not hold Vanity Fair or the photographer liable. 

Shortly before the Nyong'o case, Vogue magazine, a partner and buyer of Vanity Fair in 1936, was accused of altering actress Lena Dunham's photos. Dunham considered the modified photos to be offensive.

Richard Engel story
In 2015, Vanity Fair had to update the account it had published by the NBC News correspondent Richard Engel about the disputed circumstances of his 2012 kidnapping in Syria, stating that he had misidentified his captors.

Jeffrey Epstein story
In 2019, former contributing editor Vicky Ward said her 2003 profile of Jeffrey Epstein in Vanity Fair'' had included on-the-record accounts of Annie and Maria Farmer (who filed the earliest known criminal complaints about Epstein), but that they were later stricken from Ward's article after Epstein pressured the magazine's editor Graydon Carter.

References

External links

 Vanity Fair homepage
 Vanity Fair Mobile Blog Reader
 Vanity Fair homepage (UK)
 Vanity Fair homepage (Italy)
 Vanity Fair homepage (Spain)

 
Fashion magazines published in the United States
Lifestyle magazines published in the United States
Monthly magazines published in the United States
Condé Nast magazines
Cultural magazines published in the United States
Magazines established in 1983
Magazines published in London
Magazines published in Milan
Magazines published in Paris
Magazines published in Madrid
Magazines published in Mexico